Miss Teen Thailand is a beauty contest for Thai girls aged 15–18. The pageant is organised and sponsored by Inspire Entertainment Co., Ltd.

History

Miss Teen Thailand, a national pageant for teenage girls was first held in 1989. The pageant was created by the Miss Thailand organisation, in co-operation with Channel 7 television studios.
Miss Teen Thailand was transferred from the Yod Phu Thai company to Inspire Entertainment Co., Ltd. in 2002.

The entry requirements for Miss Teen Thailand is that girls must be of the ages between 15 - 17, which was later adjusted to 18 in 1998.

Prizes are awarded to the top 5 contestants, that being 3 (second runner), 1 (first runner) and the winner. A cash prize, gifts and endorsements deals are awarded to the contestants and a contract with Inspire Entertainment and Channel 7 for 7 years is awarded to the winner. Many previous winners and runners-up have gone on to achieve success in the entertainment industry, ranging from modelling, acting, singing and presenting.

Miss Teen Thailand is regarded as one of the four major beauty contest in Thailand.

Titleholders

Note:   Jaree Zadayang was resigned from her title and 1st Runner-up Namthip Seimthong took over the Miss Teen Thailand title.

Winners by province

Winners by region

See also

References

External links 
 Miss Teen Thailand Official site
 Inspire Entertainment

Miss Teen Thailand
Teen, Thailand
Recurring events established in 1989
1989 establishments in Thailand
Beauty pageants for youth